Solkollen is a neighbourhood in the city of Kristiansand in Agder county, Norway. It is located in the borough of Grim and in the district of Hellemyr. Solkollen is located to the north of Breimyr, to the west of the lake Eigevann, and to the north of Vestheiene.

Transportation

References

Geography of Kristiansand
Neighbourhoods of Kristiansand